A safe is a secure lockable box used for securing valuable objects against theft or damage.

Safe may also refer to:

Films
 Safe (1995 film), a 1995 drama film by Todd Haynes, starring Julianne Moore
 Safe (2012 film), a 2012 action film by Boaz Yakin, starring Jason Statham

Music 
 Safe (band), a Russian rock-band from Palekh
 Safe (musician), singer, rapper, and songwriter 
 Safe (EP), the second EP by Kittie in 2002
 "Safe" (Westlife song), 2010
 "Safe" (Phil Wickham song),
 "Safe", song by David Bowie in 1998 from Heathen

Television
 Safe (1993 film), a 1993 television film directed by Antonia Bird that won the BAFTA Television Award for Best Single Drama
 Safe (TV series), a 2018 television drama mini-series created by crime author Harlan Coben
 "Safe" (Firefly), the fifth episode of television science fiction drama series Firefly
 "Safe" (Fringe), the tenth episode of the first season of television science fiction drama series Fringe
 "Safe" (House), the sixteenth episode of the second season of television medical drama series House
 "Safe", the finale episode of television police procedural drama series The Protector

Laws and regulations
 New York Safe Act of 2013
 Secure and Fair Elections Act, or SAFE, Kansas's Voter identification law, enacted in 2011
 Secure and Fair Enforcement for Mortgage Licensing Act of 2008, or SAFE
 Securing Adolescents From Exploitation-Online Act of 2007, or SAFE
 Security and Freedom Ensured Act of 2003, or SAFE

Other uses 
 Safe, Missouri, a community in the United States
 Safe, an object classification in the SCP Foundation storytelling project
 Safe (baseball), baseball terminology
 Safe house
 Safe room
 "Safe" seat, in the nomenclature of political forecasting, a seat that is unlikely to change hands
 Scaled Agile Framework, or SAFe
 State Administration of Foreign Exchange, or SAFE, the Chinese Ministry responsible for foreign currency exchange

See also 
 SAFE (disambiguation)
 Child-safe environment, see Child protection
 Fail-safe (disambiguation)
 Safe from Harm (disambiguation)
 Safety
 Strong box (disambiguation)